Titan Pharmaceuticals, Inc. is a development-stage biotechnology company developing proprietary therapeutics using its clinically proven ProNeura® long-term, continuous drug delivery technology. The ProNeura technology has the potential to be used in developing products for treating  a number of chronic conditions where maintaining consistent, around-the-clock blood levels of medication may benefit the patient and improve medical outcomes. 

ProNeura consists of a small, semi-rigid, flexible implant made from a mixture of EVA (ethylene-vinyl acetate) and a drug substance. The resulting product is a solid matrix implant that is placed subcutaneously, normally in the inner part of the upper arm, in a simple office procedure and is removed in a similar manner at the end of the treatment period. These procedures may be performed by trained health care providers, or HCPs, including licensed and surgically qualified physicians, nurse practitioners, and physician’s assistants in a HCP’s office or other clinical setting.

Titan’s first product based on its ProNeura technology was Probuphine® (buprenorphine) implant, which was approved in the United States, Canada and the European Union, or EU, for the maintenance treatment of opioid use disorder (OUD) in clinically stable patients taking 8 mg or less a day of oral buprenorphine, In October 2020, Titan announced its decision to discontinue selling its Probuphine implant in the U.S. and wind down its commercialization activities, and to pursue a plan that will enable it to focus on its ProNeura-based product development programs. Current key ProNeura development programs include a Kappa Opioid Receptor Agonist (TP-2021) Implant for the treatment of moderate-to-severe chronic pruritus and a Nalmefene Implant for the prevention of relapse in OUD patients following detoxification from opioids.

References

External links
 Titan Pharmaceuticals website

Pharmaceutical companies of the United States
Companies based in South San Francisco, California
Companies listed on the Nasdaq
Health care companies based in California